Venus of Poetry is an oil painting by the Spanish artist Julio Romero de Torres, painted in 1913, and now exhibited at the Bilbao Fine Arts Museum. Its dimensions are 93.2 × 154 cm.

This painting is an allegory that shows the portraits of the Spanish singer Raquel Meller and her husband, the Guatemalan writer, Enrique Gómez Carrillo.

References

External links
 Tab of the painting in the Museum of Fine Arts of Bilbao

 

1913 paintings
Paintings by Julio Romero de Torres
Women in art
Paintings of Venus
Erotic art
Nude art
20th-century allegorical paintings
Allegorical paintings by Spanish artists